Halorites is an extinct genus of Triassic ammonoids belonging to the family Haloritidae.

Fossil record
This genus is known in the fossil record of the Triassic (from about 212 to 205.6 million years ago). Fossils of species within this genus have been found in Indonesia, Canada, India, Oman, Tajikistan and United States.

Bibliography
 Treatise on Invertebrate Paleontology, Part L, Ammonoidea. R. C. Moore (ed). Geological Society of America and Univ of Kansas press, 1957
Arkell et al., 1957.  Mesozoic Ammonoidea, Systematic Descriptions. Treatise on Invertebrate Paleontology Part L, Ammonoidea.  Geol Soc of Amer. and Univ Kans. Press. L199

See also
 List of ammonite genera

References

External links
 Fossiles du Permien e du Trias

Haloritidae
Ceratitida genera